Brandon D. Woolf is an American politician. A Republican, he is serving as Idaho's 21st State Controller.

Biography
Woolf, a sixth generation Idahoan, was born in 1972 to Dennis and Liz Woolf of Whitney, Idaho, the oldest of five children.  
  
Woolf graduated from Preston High School (Idaho) in 1991, and then  served a two-year church mission in Antwerp, Belgium He graduated cum laude from Utah State University in 1997 with  Bachelor of Arts in Political Science  In 2006, while working full-time at the Idaho State Controller's Office, he earned a Master of Business Administration  from Boise State University.

Career
After graduating from Utah State University he interned at the Idaho State Controller's Office, starting in 1997, and rose through the ranks serving as a training specialist, bureau chief, and division administrator over Statewide Payroll.  In  2011, he was appointed chief of staff for former State Controller Donna M. Jones.  
 
Following Jones’ automobile accident in May 2012, Governor Butch Otter, at her recommendation, appointed him temporary acting State Controller.  Following Jones' retirement on October 15, 2012, Woolf was appointed permanent State Controller to serve the remainder of her  term which expired January 2015.

Electoral history

References

External links
 Office of the Idaho State Controller, website, http://www.sco.idaho.gov
 Official State Transparency Site, website, http://transparent.idaho.gov
 Official Campaign Site, website, http://www.BrandonWoolf.com

1972 births
21st-century American politicians
American Mormon missionaries in Belgium
Boise State University alumni
Idaho Republicans
Idaho State Controllers
Latter Day Saints from Idaho
Living people
People from Franklin County, Idaho
Politicians from Logan, Utah
Utah State University alumni